Herman James Hunter (born February 14, 1961) is a former American football running back in the National Football League who played for the Philadelphia Eagles, Detroit Lions, and Houston Oilers. Hunter was a co-leader for most kickoff return yards during the 1986 NFL season with 1,007 yards. He played college football for the Tennessee State Tigers.

References

1961 births
Living people
American football running backs
American football return specialists
Philadelphia Eagles players
Detroit Lions players
Houston Oilers players
Tennessee State Tigers football players
National Football League replacement players